Song Xiuyan (born October 1955 in Tianjin) is a politician in the People's Republic of China and was the 17th Governor of Qinghai province in the China. Song was China's second female governor. She is currently the Vice President of the All-China Women's Federation.

Biography
She graduated from the Central Party School of Communist Party of China. Song's career was dominated by time in the Communist Youth League.　After a long career in the provincial government of Qinghai in Northwest China, she was elected as Governor of the province on January 23, 2005. Following Gu Xiulian, who served as Governor of Jiangsu from 1983 to 1985. 

Song is an alternate member of CPC's 15th and 16th central committee and a full member of 17th and 18th Central Committees. She is married and has a son.

External links
Photo
Song Xiuyan at China Vitae

Governors of Qinghai
People's Republic of China politicians from Tianjin
1955 births
Living people
Chinese Communist Party politicians from Tianjin
Chinese women in politics
Members of the 18th Central Committee of the Chinese Communist Party
Members of the 17th Central Committee of the Chinese Communist Party
Alternate members of the 15th Central Committee of the Chinese Communist Party
Alternate members of the 16th Central Committee of the Chinese Communist Party
All-China Women's Federation people